The Argentine general election of 1958 was held on 23 February.  Voters chose both the President and their legislators and with a turnout of 90.6% (the highest in Argentine electoral history).

Background
The year 1955 cast a long shadow over these elections. President Juan Perón was violently overthrown in September of that year and the succeeding junta banned the Peronist Party and even the possession of Peronist mementoes or the very mention of the former leader or of the late Eva Perón.  The junta did, however, convene a Civilian Advisory Board which, to the dismay of many conservatives, recommended against draconian measures or the reversal of most of Perón's reforms. They also called for a referendum ratifying the 1853 Constitution (which Perón had it heavily amended in 1949), while retaining Perón's Article 15, a section devoted to social reforms; the junta's leader, Gen. Pedro Aramburu, backed the panel's findings.  An attempted countercoup against the junta, defeated on June 10, led to the execution of 27 plotters (including numerous civilians) and derailed Aramburu's hopes for the creation of a viable political alternative to the populist leader.

Seizing the opportunity, the Radical Civic Union (UCR)'s 1951 vice-presidential nominee, Arturo Frondizi secretly secured an agreement with the exiled Perón, by which the banned Peronists would be given a voice in exchange for their support.  The pact, a mere rumor at the time, created a rift within the UCR at their party convention in November 1956, forcing Frondizi and his supporters to run on a splinter ("Intransigent") ticket and leaving more anti-Peronist UCR voters with Ricardo Balbín, the party's 1951 standard bearer. The two wings presented different candidates for the constituent assembly election called for July 28, 1957, with no clear winner, though the deadlocked assembly did ratify the Advisory Board's proposed constitutional changes.

Unmentionable by law, Perón became the central issue of the 1958 campaign. Argentina was abuzz with the staccato sounds of El-qué-te-dije (roughly translated to "You know who"), as he opposed Balbín, who accepted Pres. Aramburu's endorsement as the candidate of the ruling junta.  Balbin, and his Radical Civic Union of the People, was dealt a "February surprise" when, four days before the election, the exiled leader publicly announced his endorsement of Frondizi. Blank votes (Peronist voters' choice during the assembly elections of 1957, which they narrowly "won") became Frondizi votes, making him the winner of the 1958 elections in Argentina.

Candidates 
 Intransigent Radical Civic Union (progressive): Former Deputy Arturo Frondizi of Corrientes Province
 Popular Radical Civic Union (centrist): Former Deputy Ricardo Balbín of Buenos Aires Province
 Christian Democratic Party (progressive): Lucas Ayarragaray
 Socialist Party: Former Senator Alfredo Palacios of the city of Buenos Aires

Results

President

Chamber of Deputies

Provincial Governors

Notes

Elections in Argentina
1958 elections in Argentina
1958